Rudolf Värnlund (6 February 1900 - 16 February 1945) was a Swedish  novelist, short story writer and playwright. Värnlund had his biggest success as a playwright with his play Den heliga familjen (1932).

Biography
Värnlund grew up in the district of Södermalm in  Stockholm, Sweden. He found work as a typesetter and in his free time devoted himself to intense studies of literature and politics and began to write stories and articles. His writing was frequently published in the anarchist magazine Brand. Värnlund made several travels to Berlin in the 1920s,  experiencing the postwar anxiety and atmosphere of the time.

Värnlund had his first book, the short story collection Döda människor ("Dead humans") published in 1924. By then he had already written numerous plays and works of prose. He was very productive and published several novels in the late 1920s and 1930s which generally received poor reviews. Contemporary critics had little understanding for his intense, expressionistic style. Although later Värnlund has been regarded as an important proletarian writer. He was the first writer to depict Stockholm from a proletarian perspective in novels such as Upproret ("The Uprising", 1927), which along with the unusually lighthearted Det druckna kvarteret ("The drunken neighbourhood", 1928) and Man bygger ett hus ("A House is being built", 1938), is one of his best known novels.
His play Den heliga familjen (The holy family) opened  at the Royal Dramatic Theatre (Kungliga Dramatiska Teatern) in March 1932 
under the direction of   Alf Sjöberg.

Rudolf Värnlund died in a fire at Österskär   during 1945 and was buried at  Skogskyrkogården in Stockholm.

References

Other sources
Mattsson, Per-Olof (1989) Amor Fati - Rudolf Värnlund som prosaförfattare (Stockholm : Akademitryck AB) 
Värnlund, Holger (1992) Fem steg över parketten. Holger Värnlund om Rudolf Värnlund (Stockholm : Carlsson)

Related reading
Den svenska litteraturen 1920–1950. Modernister och arbetardiktare, Bonniers 1989
Lars Furuland, introduction to Rudolf Värnlund Man bygger ett hus, Tidens förlag 1975

20th-century Swedish novelists
20th-century Swedish dramatists and playwrights
Swedish short story writers
1900 births
1945 deaths
Deaths from fire
20th-century Swedish male writers
Swedish male novelists
Swedish male dramatists and playwrights